The Roman Catholic Archdiocese of Ozamis is a metropolitan archdiocese of the Roman Catholic Church in the province of Misamis Occidental, southern Philippines. The archdiocese cathedral is the Metropolitan Cathedral of the Immaculate Conception in Ozamiz City, and its present archbishop is Martin Jumoad. The official spelling of the church is Ozamis, while the city it is located is Ozamiz.

The larger ecclesiastical province over which the archbishop of Ozamis serves as metropolitan see covers the northwestern portion of the island of Mindanao, including the highly urbanized city of Iligan and the provinces of Misamis Occidental, Lanao del Norte, Lanao del Sur, Zamboanga del Norte and Zamboanga del Sur.

History

The Territorial Prelature of Ozamis was erected on 27 January 1951 from the territory of the then-diocese of Cagayan de Oro. This prelature covered the provinces of Lanao (which were split in 1952 into Lanao del Norte and Lanao del Sur) and Misamis Occidental, and the chartered cities of Iligan, Marawi, Oroquieta (established 1969), Ozamiz and Tangub (established 1967).

On 17 February 1971 Pope Paul VI elevated the Prelature of Ozamis into a diocese, covering only parishes within Misamis Occidental, with Jesus Varela appointed as its bishop. The new diocese became a suffragan of the Archdiocese of Zamboanga.

On 24 January 1983, Ozamis was elevated to an archdiocese, with the dioceses of Dipolog (established 1967), Iligan (established 1971) and Pagadian (established 1971), and the Prelature of Marawi (established 1976) as its suffragan dioceses. Jesus Dosado was officially installed as its first archbishop on 10 April 1983.

Suffragan dioceses
Diocese of Dipolog
Diocese of Iligan
Diocese of Pagadian

Prelature
Prelature of Marawi

Ordinaries

Prelates of Ozamis

Bishops of Ozamis

Archbishops of Ozamis

See also
Roman Catholicism in the Philippines

References

Catholic Hierarchy
GCatholic
CBCP

Roman Catholic dioceses in the Philippines
Archdiocese
Christian organizations established in 1951
Roman Catholic dioceses and prelatures established in the 20th century
Ozamiz
Religion in Misamis Occidental
Misamis Occidental
1951 establishments in the Philippines